Baron Eugène Daniel von Rothschild (6 March 1884 – 25 April 1976) or simply Eugène von Rothschild was a member of the notable Rothschild family. He was part of the 5th generation of Rothschild (measured from Mayer Amschel) and his parents were Salomon and Bettina Rothschild. He was descended from the Austrian branch of the family.

Personal life 
He served in the World War I in the Austrian Imperial Army but after the war was less need for soldiers and thus he retired. 
He then married Catherine "Kitty" Wolf on 28 April 1925, after they lived together in Paris. Catherine (who was also American) was a friend of Wallis Simpson and after Edward VIII abdicated he traveled to Catherine and Eugéne's Castle in Enzesfeld near Vienna. 
Shortly after the beginning of World War II Catherine and Eugéne left for Long Island where Catherine later died in 1946. Eugéne then remarried the actress Jeanne Stuart on 21 December 1952. They both lived in New York City and Long Island but eventually left to live in Monte Carlo where he died in 1976.

References 

1884 births
1976 deaths
Eugene Daniel